Sigismund (variants: Sigmund, Siegmund) is a German proper name, meaning "protection through victory", from Old High German sigu "victory" + munt "hand, protection". Tacitus latinises it Segimundus. There appears to be an older form of the High German word "Sieg" (victory): sigis, obviously Gothic and an inferred Germanic form, and there is a younger form: sigi, which is Old Saxon or Old High German sigu (both from about 9th century). A 5th century Prince of Burgundy was known both as Sigismund and Sigimund (see Ernst Förstemann, Altdeutsche Personennamen, 1906; Henning Kaufmann, Altdeutsche Personennamen, Ergänzungsband, 1968).
Its Hungarian equivalent is Zsigmond.

A Lithuanian name Žygimantas, meaning "wealth of (military) campaign", from Lithuanian žygis "campaign, march" + manta "goods, wealth" has been a substitution of the name Sigismund in the Lithuanian language, from which it was adopted by the Ruthenian language as Жыгімонт (such are the cases of Sigismund Kestutaitis, Sigismund Korybut, Sigismund I the Old, Sigismund II Augustus).  The Polish spelling is Zygmunt, and the Croatian variant is Žigmund.

Sigismund was the name of various European rulers:

 Saint Sigismund of Burgundy (died 523), King of the Burgundians
 Sigismund I, Prince of Anhalt-Dessau (died 1405)
 Sigismund, Holy Roman Emperor (1368–1437), also King of Hungary and King of Bohemia
 Sigismund Kęstutaitis (c. 1365–1440), Grand Duke of Lithuania
 Sigismund Korybut (c. 1395-c. 1435), Lithuanian duke who participated in Hussite Wars
 Sigismund II, Prince of Anhalt-Dessau (died after 1452)
 Sigismund, Archduke of Austria (1427–1496), ruler of Further Austria
 Sigismund of Bavaria (1439–1501), Duke of Bavaria
 Sigismund I the Old (1467–1548), King of Poland, Grand Duke of Lithuania
 Sigismund von Herberstein (1486–1566), Carniolan diplomat, writer, historian and member of the Holy Roman Empire Imperial Council
 Sigismund II Augustus (1520–1572), King of Poland, Grand Duke of Lithuania
 Sigismund of Brandenburg (1538–1566), Prince-Archbishop of Magdeburg and Administrator of the Prince-Bishopric of Halberstadt
 Sigismund Rákóczi (died 1608), briefly Prince of Transylvania
 Sigismund III Vasa (1566–1632), King of Poland, Sweden and Grand Duke of Lithuania
 Sigismund Báthory (1572–1613), Prince of Transylvania
 John Sigismund (1572-1618), Elector of Brandenburg
 Sigismund Francis of Austria (1630–1665), ruler of Further Austria
 Prince Sigismund of Prussia (1864-1866)
 Prince Sigismund of Prussia (1896–1978)
 Ishak Bey Kraloğlu or Sigismund of Bosnia (born in the 1450s?), son of King Stephen Thomas of Bosnia

Others named Sigismund include:
 Sigismund Albicus (c. 1360–1427), Roman Catholic Archbishop of Prague
 Sigismund Bachrich (1841–1913), Hungarian composer, violinist and violist
 Sigismund Bacstrom (c. 1750-1805), German doctor, surgeon and scholar of alchemy
 Sigismund Payne Best (1885–1978), British secret agent during the First and Second World Wars
 Sigismund von Braun (1911–1998), German diplomat and Secretary of State
Sigismund Danielewicz (1847–1927), California trade union organizer and anarchist
 Sigmund Freud (1856–1939), Austrian founder of psychoanalysis born Sigismund Schlomo Freud
 Sigismund Gelenius (1497–1554), Greek scholar and humanist
 Sigismund Goldwater (1873–1942), physician, hospital administrator, and New York City Commissioner of Health
 Sigismund von Götzen (1576–1650), German diplomat and politician
 Sigismund Ernst Hohenwart (1745–1825), Bishop of Linz
 Sigismund Koelle (1820–1902), German missionary and pioneer scholar of African languages
 Zsigmond Kornfeld (1852–1909), Hungarian banker and baron
 Sigismund Ernst Richard Krone (1861–1917), German naturalist, zoologist, spelunker, archaeologist and researcher
 Sigismund Mendl (1866—1945), British politician
 Sigismund von Neukomm (1778–1858), Austrian composer and pianist
 Sigismund Felix Freiherr von Ow-Felldorf (1855–1936), Bishop of Passau
 Sigismund von Reitzenstein (1766–1847), first minister of state of the Grand Duchy of Baden
 Sigismund von Schlichting (1829–1909), Prussian general and military theorist
 Sigismund von Schrattenbach (1698–1771), Archbishop of Salzburg
 Sigismund Streit (1687–1775), German merchant and art patron in Venice
 Sigismund Zaremba (1861–1915), Ukrainian and Russian composer
 Sigismund Zinzan, an equerry to Queen Elizabeth I of England

Sigismund may also refer to fictional characters:

 Segismundo, main character of Calderón de la Barca's La vida es sueño.
Sigismund, a Space Marine character from the Warhammer 40,000 novel series, The Horus Heresy.

Other things named Sigismund:

 Sigismund Bell, a famous bell in the Wawel Cathedral in Kraków, cast in 1520

See also 
 Sigmund (given name) for people named Sigmund or Siegmund
 Sig (given name)

German masculine given names